The Maragatan Sphinx (Spanish:La esfinge maragata) is a 1950 Spanish drama film directed by Antonio de Obregón and starring Paquita de Ronda. It takes its title from the Maragatería region.

Synopsis 
The action takes place in a Maragata hacienda that is sinking into misery, whose situation can only be resolved through a marriage of convenience. But the marriageable girl, during a train trip, falls in love with a young poet and is reciprocated. Her family opposes this relationship, since they have promised her in marriage with a man of good position.

Cast
 Paquita de Ronda as Mariflor Salvadores
 Luis Peña as Rogelio
 Juan José Martínez Casado as Antonio Salvadores
 Juan de Landa as Tío Cristóbal
 Fernando Fernández de Córdoba
 Carmen Reyes
 Julia Caba Alba as Tía de Mariflor
 Gabriel Algara
 Juana Mansó
 Julia Pachelo
 Manena Algora
 Emilio Pages
 Concha López Silva
 Mari Paz Molinero

References

Bibliography 
 Nicolás Fernández-Medina & Maria Truglio. Modernism and the Avant-garde Body in Spain and Italy. Routledge, 2016.

External links 
 

1950 films
1950s Spanish-language films
Films directed by Antonio de Obregón
Films scored by Jesús García Leoz
Spanish drama films
1950 drama films
Spanish black-and-white films
1950s Spanish films